Jim Lightfoot may refer to:
 Jim Ross Lightfoot, U.S. Representative from Iowa
 Jim Lightfoot (speedway rider), English speedway rider